Prairie Street is one of four Metra railroad stations in Blue Island, Illinois along the Beverly Branch of the Rock Island District Line, and one of five total within the town of Blue Island. In Metra's zone-based fare system, Prairie Street is in zone D. As of 2018, Prairie Street is the 220th busiest of Metra's 236 non-downtown stations, with an average of 30 weekday boardings.

As of 2022, Prairie Street is served as a flag stop by 20 trains in each direction on weekdays, by 10 inbound trains and 11 outbound trains on Saturdays, and by eight trains in each direction on Sundays.

Parking is available on both sides of the tracks at a dead end at Prairie Street, south of the Burr Oak Avenue Bridge, which also crosses the main line and the freight yards between the two lines, the Burr Oak Yard on the north side of the bridge and the Iowa Interstate Railroad-Chicago Rail Link. Though a station house exists it contains no agent, and the station is a flag stop. No bus connections are available.

References

External links

Station from Google Maps Street View

Metra stations in Illinois
Blue Island, Illinois
Railway stations in Cook County, Illinois